Valentina Cámara (born 18 November 1993) is an Argentine footballer who plays as a defender for Spanish Segunda División Pro club CD Femarguín and the Argentina women's national team.

International career
Cámara made her senior debut for Argentina during the 2018 Copa América Femenina on 5 April that year in a 1–3 loss to Brazil.

References

1993 births
Living people
People from Viedma
Argentine women's footballers
Women's association football defenders
Club Atlético Belgrano footballers
UAI Urquiza (women) players
Argentina women's international footballers
Argentine expatriate women's footballers
Argentine expatriate sportspeople in Spain
Expatriate women's footballers in Spain